Eleonore von Habsburg-Lothringen (Eleonore Maria del Pilar Iona Christina Jelena; born 28 February 1994) is an Austrian jewellery designer, gemologist, and member of the House of Habsburg-Lorraine.

Early life and background 
Eleonore Habsburg-Lorraine was born in 1994 in Salzburg to Karl, a politician and head of the House of Habsburg-Lorraine, and Francesca Thyssen-Bornemisza de Kászon et Impérfalva, an art collector and by birth member of the Thyssen-Bornemisza family. Her maternal grandparents are Baron Hans Heinrich Thyssen-Bornemisza and Fiona Frances Elaine Campbell-Walter, a model with aristocratic background, whose father Vice-Admiral Keith McNeill Campbell-Walter was Aide-de-camp to George VI. Her paternal grandparents were Archduke Otto Habsburg, Crown Prince of Austria and Princess Regina of Saxe-Meiningen. Her paternal great-grandparents Charles I of Austria and Zita of Bourbon-Parma were the last Emperor and Empress of Austria. Her brother is race car driver Ferdinand Habsburg.

Education and career 
Habsburg-Lorraine attended boarding school in Gstaad before studying law at the European Business School London. She completed her master's degree at Istituto Marangoni Milan in Fine Jewellery Design in 2020 and works as a jewellery designer. Habsburg has also worked as a fashion model, being featured in advertisement campaigns and walking the runway for Dolce & Gabbana.

Personal life 
On 20 July 2020, Eleonore von Habsburg-Lorraine married Belgian race car driver Jérôme d'Ambrosio in a small civil ceremony at the Civil Registry of Monaco. On 20 October 2021 she gave birth to a son, Otto d'Ambrosio, named after her grandfather Otto von Habsburg.

References 

1994 births
Living people
Austrian female models
Austrian people of American descent
Eleonore von Habsburg
Alumni of European Business School London
Fashion influencers
Austrian bloggers
Austrian women bloggers